Juhi is an Indian given name which means "jasmine flower".

Notable people named Juhi 
 Juhi Babbar (born 1979), Indian Hindi film actress, daughter of Raj Babbar
 Juhi Chawla (born 1967), Indian film actress and 1984 Miss India beauty contest winner
 Juhi Chaturvedi (born 1975), Indian author, columnist, and speaker
 Juhi Dewangan (born 1994), Indian badminton player
 Juhi Parmar (born 1980), Indian anchor, dancer, singer, television actress and presenter
 Juhi Rustagi (born 1998), Indian model and television actress

Indian feminine given names